A hook is a tool consisting of a length of material, typically metal, that contains a portion that is curved or indented, such that it can be used to grab onto, connect, or otherwise attach itself onto another object. In a number of uses, one end of the hook is pointed, so that this end can pierce another material, which is then held by the curved or indented portion. Some kinds of hooks, particularly fish hooks, also have a barb, a backwards-pointed projection near the pointed end of the hook to ensure that once the hook is embedded in its target, it can not easily be removed.

Variations

 Bagging hook, a large sickle or reaping hook used for harvesting grain
 Bondage hook, used in sexual bondage play
 Cabin hook, a hooked bar that engages into an eye screw, used on doors
 Cap hook, hat ornament of the 15th and 16th centuries
 Cargo hook (helicopter), different types of hook systems for helicopters
 Crochet hook, used for crocheting thread or yarn
 Drapery hook, for hanging drapery
 Dress hook, fashion accessory
 Ear hook, to attach earrings
 Fish hook, used to catch fish
 Flesh-hook, used in cooking meat
 Grappling hook, a hook attached to a rope, designed to be thrown and snagged on a target
 Hook and chain coupler
 Hook (hand tool), also known as longshoreman's hook and bale hook, a tool used for securing and moving loads
 Hook-and-eye closure, a clothing fastener
 Hook and loop fastener
 Lifting hook, for grabbing and lifting loads
 Mail hook, for grabbing mail bags without stopping a train
 Meat hook,  for hanging up meat or carcasses of animals in butcheries and meat industry
 Prosthetic hook or transradial prosthesis, part of a prosthetic arm for amputees
 Purse hook, used to keep a woman's purse from touching the floor
 Shepherd's hook, a staff used in herding sheep or other animals
 Siege hook, an Ancient Roman weapon used to pull stones from a wall during a siege
 Tailhook, used by aircraft to snag cables in order to slow down more quickly

References

Tools
Ironmongery